Thomas Joplin (1790?–1847) was an English timber merchant and banker.

Life
He was born about 1790 in Newcastle-upon-Tyne, the second son of the timber merchant Thomas Joplin, who died in 1808. He was in business at the family firm in New Road with his elder brother William, as W. and T. Joplin & Co. He studied political economy.

In 1824 the Provincial Bank of Ireland was formed in London, and Joplin became actively concerned in its management. In 1828, shortly after joint-stock banks were permitted 65 miles from London, Joplin left the Provincial Bank of Ireland, and submitted a scheme to his cousin George Fife Angas for the association of a number of provincial banks together under a central management, but with considerable local freedom of action. He proposed to call the new concern the National Provincial Bank of England. The estimated expense of initiating the scheme was £300, which Angas in 1829 engaged to find. The plan was carried out in 1833, when the National Provincial Bank was established; Joplin's name was in the deed of settlement as one of the directors and as the originator of the bank.

Joplin helped to establish banks at Lancaster, Huddersfield, Bradford, Manchester and elsewhere. Some were successful, but he made little money from his efforts. About 1836 a dispute with his fellow-directors led to his leaving the National Provincial Bank. 

Joplin died at Böhmischdorf in Silesia, where he had gone for his health, on 12 April 1847.

Works
Joplin published at Newcastle in 1822 An Essay on the General Principles and Present Practices of Banking in England and Scotland; with Observations upon the Justice and Policy of an immediate Alteration in the Charter of the Bank of England, and the Measures to be pursued in order to effect it. This work explained the system of Scottish banking, and suggested the establishment of a joint-stock bank; it went through several editions. 

This pamphlet launched a strong attack on the monopoly position of the Bank of England and proposed the setting up of joint stock banks. These ideas were subsequently taken up to a certain extent in the system initiated in 1828. It was followed by many others. In his book Thomas Joplin and Classical Economics (1993), Denis Patrick O'Brien shows that Joplin was ahead of his time in his use of formal models and empirically tested predictions.

Further works by Joplin were: 

 Views on the subject of Corn and Currency, Newcastle-on-Tyne, 1826. 
 Views on the Corn Bill of 1827, and other Measures of Government; together with a further Exposition of certain Principles on Corn and Currency before published, 1828. 
 An Analysis and History of the Currency Question; together with an Account of the Origin and Growth of Joint-stock Banking in England, 1832. 
 A Letter to the Directors of the National Provincial Bank of England, 1834. 
 Case for Parliamentary Inquiry into the circumstances of the [Financial] Panic [of 1825], in a Letter, &c., 1835? 

 On our Monetary System …; with an Explanation of the Causes by which the Pressures in the Money Market are produced, and a Plan for their Remedy, 2nd edit. 1840. 
 The Cause and Cure of our Commercial Embarrassments, 1841. 
 An Essay on the Condition of the National Provincial Bank of England, with a view to its Improvement, 1843. 
 Currency Reform: Improvement, not Depreciation, 1844. 
 An Examination of Sir Robert Peel's Currency Bill of 1844, 2nd edit., with supplementary observations, 1845. 
 Circular to the Directors and Managers of the Joint-stock Banks; containing a brief Explanation of the Advantages that would result from the Government adopting as its own the Circulation of all the Banks of Issue in the Three Kingdoms, 3rd edit. 1845.

Secondary sources

 Blaug, Mark (ed.) (1999) - Who's who in economics (3rd edition).

Notes

Attribution

External links
RBS Heritage Online, Thomas Joplin

English economists
Classical economists
1790 births
1847 deaths
Businesspeople from Newcastle upon Tyne